Apodinium is a genus of dinoflagellates belonging to the family Apodiniaceae.

Species:

Apodinium chaetoceratis 
Apodinium chattonii 
Apodinium floodii 
Apodinium mycetoides 
Apodinium rhizophorum 
Apodinium zygorhizum

References

Dinophyceae
Dinoflagellate genera